The Luzon Aurora forest mouse (Apomys aurorae) is a forest mouse endemic to Aurora in Luzon, Philippines.

References

Apomys
Rodents of the Philippines
Mammals described in 2011
Endemic fauna of the Philippines